Almoez Ali Zainalabedeen Mohamed Abdulla (born 19 August 1996) is a professional footballer who plays as a striker for Qatar Stars League side Al-Duhail, whom he captains. Born in Sudan, he plays for the Qatar national team.

Ali is a member of the Qatar squad which won the 2019 AFC Asian Cup, where he scored nine goals, which also serves as the record for most goals scored at an Asian Cup.

Club career
Ali was born in Sudan and moved to Qatar as a child. His mother is a native Sudanese. He started playing for Al-Mesaimeer when he was 7 years old, then moved to Aspire Academy and played youth football at Lekhwiya SC. He was also a part of the youth setup for Belgian club Eupen in 2015.

In July 2015, Ali joined the senior team of Austrian club LASK. His first and only league goal for the club's first team came on 27 November 2015 against Floridsdorfer AC. In January 2016, he left the club and joined Cultural Leonesa in Spain's third tier, the Segunda División B. On 3 April 2016, he scored his first goal for Cultural Leonesa in a 1–0 victory over Arandina, becoming the first Qatari footballer ever to score in a Spanish league.

Ali rejoined his former youth club Lekhwiya SC for the 2016–17 season. He scored his first goal for the club on 27 September 2016 in a 5–4 win against Muaither. He went on to make 25 appearances and scoring 8 goals, as well as providing 8 assists and being awarded as the best U23 player of the season as his club won the Qatar Stars League.

In the following season, Almoez Ali was part of the newly rebranded Al-Duhail, as his former club was merged with El Jaish, and was part of the unbeaten QSL title campaign.

International career
Almoez Ali unofficially made his inaugural appearance for the senior national team in a friendly against Bahrain in December 2013. The match was not recognized by FIFA.

In 2014, Almoez Ali was a part of the Qatar U19 team that won the 2014 AFC U-19 Championship. In 2015, he was part of the Qatar U20 squad for the 2015 FIFA U-20 World Cup. He played in the three group stage matches, but Qatar did not advance to the knockout stage.

On 8 August 2016, Almoez Ali made his official senior debut for the national team as a substitute in 2–1 win against Iraq. Furthermore, he was the top scorer in the 2018 AFC U-23 Championship with six goals and played an instrumental role in Qatar's third-place ranking.

2019 AFC Asian Cup

He was selected for Qatar's squad in the 2019 AFC Asian Cup. He found the net in his team's first group stage game against Lebanon. In the next game against North Korea, he scored a four goals in a span of 51 minutes, the second fastest time to four goals after Iranian Ali Daei, who scored four goals in 23 minutes against South Korea in the 1996 AFC Asian Cup.

The following match, against Saudi Arabia, he increased his tally in the competition to seven goals after scoring both goals in the 2–0 win. In doing so, he became the joint-top scorer in the AFC Asian Cup Group Stage, sharing the record with Ali Daei of Iran, Choi Soon-ho of South Korea and Naohiro Takahara of Japan. He also broke Mansour Muftah's all-time record of five goals scored for the Qatar national team in the AFC Asian Cup.

In the semi-final against United Arab Emirates, Ali scored his eighth goal of the competition in a 4–0 win, equalling Ali Daei's mark established in 1996 as the most goals scored in a single AFC Asian Cup edition. He broke that record in the following game after scoring the opening goal with a bicycle kick at the 2019 AFC Asian Cup Final match against Japan.

Eligibility dispute
On 30 January 2019, soon after the 4–0 defeat at the 2019 AFC Asian Cup semifinal, the UAE FA lodged a formal appeal to the AFC over the eligibility of Sudanese-born Almoez Ali and Iraqi-born Bassam Al-Rawi, claiming that they did not qualify to play for Qatar on residency grounds based on Article 7 of the FIFA statute  which states that a player's eligibility to play for a representative team if he has "lived continuously for at least five years after reaching the age of 18 on the territory of the relevant association". It was alleged that Almoez had not lived continuously in Qatar for at least five years over the age of 18, although the player claimed that his mother was born in Qatar. On 1 February 2019, the AFC Disciplinary and Ethics Committee dismissed the protest lodged by the United Arab Emirates Football Association without further comments or explanation. In August 2020, the case was finally settled at CAS (Court of Arbirtration for Sport, based in Lausanne, Switzerland) with the UAE losing its appeal against the Asian Football Confederation's (AFC) decision.

2019 Copa América
On 16 June 2019, Ali scored in Qatar's 2–2 draw with Paraguay in the 2019 Copa América.

2021 CONCACAF Gold Cup
Ali was included in Qatar's squad for the 2021 CONCACAF Gold Cup. He scored four goals in the competition to clinch the top scorer award.

2022 FIFA World Cup
In November 2022, he was included in Qatar's squad for the 2022 FIFA World Cup.

Career statistics

Club

International goals
Scores and results list Qatar's goal tally first, score column indicates score after each Ali goal.

Honours 
Al-Duhail
 Qatar Stars League: 2016–17, 2017–18, 2019–20
 Emir of Qatar Cup: 2018, 2019
 Qatar Cup: 2018
 Sheikh Jassim Cup: 2016

Qatar U19
 AFC U-19 Championship: 2014

Qatar
 AFC Asian Cup: 2019
 WAFF Championship: 2014

Individual
 AFC U-23 Championship top goalscorer: 2018
 AFC Asian Cup top goalscorer: 2019
 AFC Asian Cup Best Player: 2019
 AFC Asian Cup Team of the Tournament: 2019
 IFFHS AFC Men's Team of the Decade 2011–2020
 CONCACAF Gold Cup Golden Boot: 2021
 CONCACAF Gold Cup Best XI: 2021

References

External links 

 
 
 
 

1996 births
Living people
Sudanese emigrants to Qatar
Naturalised citizens of Qatar
People from Khartoum
Qatari footballers
Association football forwards
Mesaimeer SC players
Lekhwiya SC players
K.A.S. Eupen players
FC Juniors OÖ players
LASK players
Cultural Leonesa footballers
Al-Duhail SC players
2. Liga (Austria) players
Austrian Regionalliga players
Austrian 2. Landesliga players
Segunda División B players
Qatar Stars League players
Qatar youth international footballers
Qatar under-20 international footballers
Qatar international footballers
2019 AFC Asian Cup players
2019 Copa América players
2021 CONCACAF Gold Cup players
AFC Asian Cup-winning players
Qatari expatriate footballers
Qatari expatriate sportspeople in Belgium
Qatari expatriate sportspeople in Austria
Qatari expatriate sportspeople in Spain
Expatriate footballers in Belgium
Expatriate footballers in Austria
Expatriate footballers in Spain
2022 FIFA World Cup players